Beautiful Mess is the title of the ninth studio album by the British pop group Swing Out Sister. It was produced by group member Andy Connell, who has been with Swing Out Sister since its inception.

Release
The album was initially released in Japan in February 2008 on Avex Trax, then issued in the U.K. later in the year. Beautiful Mess was released in the U.S. in May 2009, distributed by the Shanachie Records label. The album has reached #5 on the Billboard Top Contemporary Jazz Albums chart.

Musicians
Since the group's second album, Kaleidoscope World, Swing Out Sister has consisted primarily of Andy Connell and Corinne Drewery. Both reprise familiar roles on this album, with Drewery on lead and backing vocals and Connell contributing musical arrangements. In addition, Connell produced this album, his first for the group, replacing longtime producer and collaborator Paul Staveley O'Duffy. Additional musicians include Tim Cansfield on guitar, Jody Linscott on percussion and Gina Foster and the Champagnettes on backing vocals.

Critical reception
Beautiful Mess has received generally favorable reviews from music critics and journalists. Allmusic gave the album four stars out of a possible five. Daryl Easlea of the BBC reviewed the album soon after its British release in September 2008 and described the music as "(s)weet, time-warped; unmistakeable; with their brand of London Embankment sunrises and cocktail party sunsets, it's so very Swing Out Sister". The reviewer continued that "Swing Out Sister could still give Adele, Duffy and all the latest crop a spin in their soft top for their money." Elysa Gardner of the USA Today chose "Time Tracks You Down" as one of her ten most intriguing tracks for the week on 18 May 2009, stating that "(r)etro-soul doesn't get much smoother or sweeter than this..." Music critic Mario Tarradell of the Dallas Morning News gave the album an "A" rating, describing it as "exquisite" and stating that the group "continue to make gorgeously lush and rhythmically jazzy albums whether stateside audiences care or not."

Track listing
"Something Every Day" (Andy Connell, Corinne Drewery, Gina Foster) (4:28)
"Time Tracks You Down" (Connell, Drewery) (3:56)
"Butterfly" (Connell, Drewery, Foster) (4:41)
"My State of Mind" (Connell, Drewery, Foster) (4:27)
"I'd Be Happy" (Connell, Drewery) (3:43)
"Butterfly Lullaby (Connell, Drewery) (3:48)
"Secret Love (You're Invisible)" (Hajime Uchiyama, Drewery) (4:26)
"All I Say, All I Do" (Connell, Drewery) (4:26)
"Out There" (Connell, Drewery) (4:30)
"Beautiful Mess" (Connell, Drewery) (4:09)
"Butterfly" (Little Wizard Mix) (Connell, Drewery, Foster) (3:28)
"Something Every Day" (Little Wizard Mix) (Connell, Drewery, Foster) (4:25)

References

External links
Beautiful Mess Japan CD release info from discogs.com

2008 albums
Swing Out Sister albums
Smooth jazz albums